A number of steamships have been named Kalliope, including:
, a cargo ship in service 1914–21
, a Hansa A Type cargo ship in service 1944–45

Ship names